The bulolo rainbowfish (Chilatherina bulolo) is a species of rainbowfish in the subfamily Melanotaeniinae. Bulolo Rainbowfish are found in the fast flowing, rapid water of the mountain streams in the Markham and Ramu river systems of north-eastern Papua New Guinea. It was first collected in 1934 and then not again until 1978.

Sources

 Ryan Junghenn Aquarium Fish Experts

Chilatherina
Freshwater fish of Papua New Guinea
Taxonomy articles created by Polbot
Fish described in 1938